The 1912 French Grand Prix was a Grand Prix motor race held at Dieppe on 25–26 June 1912.

The Race
The race was run over two days with the drivers completing ten laps on each day and their times being aggregated to produce the winner (similar to a modern rally race). Coupe de l'Auto cars competed alongside Grand Prix cars. The coupe cars were limited to 3 litre engines. The only restriction on the Grand Prix cars was that cars must be no wider than 1.75 metres. Riding mechanic Jean Bassignano was killed in a lap 3 crash when his driver Léon Collinet put a wheel off and flipped. 
47 cars started the race at 30 second intervals, with Victor Rigal's Sunbeam the first to start.

Victor Hemery, driving a Lorraine-Dietrich, was the first to complete a lap, but David Bruce-Brown's Fiat led on time after lap one and retained the lead overnight, more than two minutes ahead of Georges Boillot's Peugeot. Louis Wagner was third at the halfway stage. During the second day, Bruce-Brown was disqualified for refuelling away from the pits on lap 15, giving Boillot a comfortable victory by over thirteen minutes from Wagner.

The Sunbeams performed extremely well in the Coupe de l'Auto race, with Rigal finishing in first place, Resta second, and Medinger third. Due to their astonishing speed they were also placed in third, fourth, and fifth places in the Grand Prix itself, beating many, much more powerful machines.
Rigal averaged 65.35 m.p.h. over the 956 miles, only 3 m.p.h. less than Boillot in his 7.6 litre Peugeot.

Classification

References

French Grand Prix
French
Grand Prix